The Schwidenegg (2,007 m) is a mountain of the Bernese Alps, located north of Weissenburg in the canton of Bern. It lies between the valleys of Morgete and Buuschetal.

References

External links
Schwidenegg on Hikr.org

Mountains of the Alps
Mountains of Switzerland
Mountains of the canton of Bern
Two-thousanders of Switzerland